KXDF-CD, virtual and VHF digital channel 13, is a low-power, Class A CBS-affiliated television station licensed to Fairbanks, Alaska, United States. Owned by Atlanta-based Gray Television, it is a sister station to NBC affiliate KTVF (channel 11) and primary MeTV and secondary MyNetworkTV affiliate KFXF-LD (channel 22). The stations share studios on Braddock Street in downtown Fairbanks, while KXDF-CD's transmitter is located northeast of the city on Cranberry Ridge.

History
KXDF-CD signed on the air on August 7, 1996, as K13XD, the area's sixth television station, four months after longtime CBS affiliate KTVF switched to NBC. It was owned by Tanana Valley Television Company alongside Fox affiliate KFXF. Before channel 13 signed on, select CBS programming had been seen on KFXF. The addition of K13XD meant that Fairbanks would finally have a station for each of the four main networks: KATN (ABC), KFXF (Fox), KTVF (NBC), and K13XD (CBS), along with KJNP-TV (TBN) and KUAC-TV (PBS).

In 2000, the station upgraded to a class A license, but retained its translator-style call sign; eventually the station branded with a contraction of its translator call as "KXD". In 2012, the station flash-cut from analog to digital, modifying its call sign to K13XD-D. The call letters were changed to KXDD-CD on November 7, 2016, and to KXDF-CD on December 16, 2016.

On November 8, 2016, Northern Lights Media, the subsidiary of Gray Television that operates Anchorage stations KTUU-TV and KYES-TV, announced that it would buy KXDD-CD, KFXF-LD and KTVF for $8 million in cash, pending FCC approval. The sale was completed on January 13, 2017.

Full-market over-the-air coverage 
In addition to its own digital signal, KXDF-CD receives full-market over-the-air coverage via a high definition simulcast on KTVF's third digital subchannel (UHF channel 26.3 or virtual channel 11.3 via PSIP) from a transmitter on the Ester Dome. The simulcast is most likely a direct compensation for how on March 2, 2017, Tanana Valley Television surrendered their license for KFYF (the original full-market over-the-air distributor of the programming of KFXF-LD) back to the FCC, which cancelled it on March 10. Like KTVF does presently, KFYF had simulcast KXDF-CD on a subchannel.

Newscasts
Despite its ownership with KTVF, KXDF-CD continues to maintain a small-scale local news department separate from channel 11, airing two half-hour newscasts on weekdays at 5:00 p.m. and 11:00 p.m. Under its old ownership, the station's main news theme in the mid to late 2000s was the main menu theme to the 2000 video game Hitman: Codename 47.

Technical information

Subchannels
The station's digital signal is multiplexed:

References

External links
 webcenterfairbanks.com

CBS network affiliates
1996 establishments in Alaska
Television channels and stations established in 1996
XDF-CD
Low-power television stations in the United States
Gray Television